Anders Samuel Lindskog (16 January 1875 – 16 June 1917) was a Swedish sport shooter who competed in the 1912 Summer Olympics.

He was born in Nysund, Örebro Municipality.

In 1912 he finished sixth in the 100 metre running deer, single shots event as well as sixth in the 100 metre running deer, double shots competition.

References

1875 births
1917 deaths
Swedish male sport shooters
Running target shooters
Olympic shooters of Sweden
Shooters at the 1912 Summer Olympics
People from Örebro Municipality
Sportspeople from Örebro County
20th-century Swedish people